The Eighth Government of the Lao People's Democratic Republic was elected by the 1st Ordinary Session of the 8th National Assembly on 20 April 2016. Its replacement, the 9th Government, was elected on 22 March 2021 at the 1st Ordinary Session of the 9th National Assembly.

Ministries

Committee heads

References

Specific

Bibliography
Books:
 

Governments of Laos
2016 establishments in Laos
2021 disestablishments in Laos